Macrodomoceras is a genus of oncocerids, family Polyelasmoceratidae, from the Middle Devonian of Australia.

The shell of Macrodomoceras is a compressed, endogastric cyrtocone, i.e. section higher than wide and curved with the ventral side concave, with a subtriangular cross section. The siphuncle is ventral, marginal, with continuous actinosiphonate lamellae.

Macrodomoceras resembles Danaoceras in its subtriangular cross section, but its sutures have bluntly pointed ventral saddles.

References

 Walter C. Sweet, 1964. Nautiloidea - Oncocerida; Treatise on Invertebrate Paleontology, Part K. Geological Society of America.

Prehistoric nautiloid genera
Oncocerida